The Syndicat de l'Architecture is a French labor union for architects co-founded by Jean Nouvel.

External links
 Website

Architecture organizations
Trade unions in France
Year of establishment missing